2012 Empress's Cup Final was the 34th final of the Empress's Cup competition. The final was played at Omiya Football Stadium in Saitama on December 24, 2012. INAC Kobe Leonessa won the championship.

Overview
Defending champion INAC Kobe Leonessa won their 3rd title, by defeating JEF United Chiba – with Asuna Tanaka goal. INAC Kobe Leonessa won the title for 3 years in a row.

Match details

See also
2012 Empress's Cup

References

Empress's Cup
2012 in Japanese women's football